is a sound effects company working in the television, movie, radio, video, CD, cassette and game animation industry in Japan.

Company history
In 1980, the company name was changed to Fizz Sound Creation.

Employees
Executives
Representative Director: Masahiro Shōji (庄司 雅弘)
Director: Akihiko Matsuda (松田 昭彦) (retired in dec. 2015)
Director: Hidenori Arai (新井 秀徳) (retired in dec. 2015)
Auditor: Hiroko Harada (原田 浩子)

Staff
Masahiro Shōji (庄司 雅弘)
Masami Kitakata (北方 将実)
Yuka Kazama (風間 結花)
Former staff
Atsushi Harada (原田 敦)
Hidenori Ishida (石田 秀憲)
Osamu Itō (伊藤 修)
Kenichi Mori (森 賢一) (transferred to Harada Sound. then went over to Anime Sound Production and later left)
Keisuke Ishida (石田 圭介)
Shinji Kobayashi (小林 真二)
Katsumi Itō (伊藤 克己) (left and founded Swara Productions)
Shōji Katō (加藤 昭二) (left and founded Anime Sound Production, retired)
Yasufumi Yoda (依田 安文) (later part of Wai Wai Sound, died in 2008)
Akihiko Matsuda (松田 昭彦) (now part of JetSoundEngine)
Hidenori Arai (新井 秀徳) (now part of JetSoundEngine)
Mutsuhiro Nishimura (西村 睦弘) (now part of JetSoundEngine)
Mitsuru Kageyama (蔭山 満) 
Kentarō Washio (鷲尾 健太郎)

Works
Listed in alphabetic order.
Principal production
3000 Leagues in Search of Mother (World Masterpiece Theater)
The Adventures of Tom Sawyer (World Masterpiece Theater)
Adventures of the Little Koala
After War Gundam X
Ai no Wakakusa Monogatari (World Masterpiece Theater)
Wakakusa Monogatari Nan to Jo-sensei (World Masterpiece Theater)
Anne of Green Gables (World Masterpiece Theater)
Amada Anime Series: Super Mario Bros. (OVA)
ATASHIn'CHI
Beet the Vandel Buster
Black Jack
The Bush Baby (World Masterpiece Theater)
The Care Bears (DiC Series)
Chibi Maruko-chan
City Hunter series
Crayon Shin-chan
Corrector Yui
Cutie Honey
D.C.: Da Capo
Daddy Long-Legs (World Masterpiece Theater)
A Dog of Flanders (World Masterpiece Theater)
Dragon Ball
Dragon Ball GT
Dragon Ball Z
Dr. Slump
Doraemon series
Erudoran series
Grimm's Fairy Tale Classics (World Masterpiece Theater)
Jikū Senshi Spielban
Katri the Milkmaid (World Masterpiece Theater)
The Swiss Family Robinson: Flone of the Mysterious Island (World Masterpiece Theater)
Kochira Katsushika-ku Kameari Kōen-mae Hashutsujo
Lassie (World Masterpiece Theater)
Little Lord Fauntleroy (World Masterpiece Theater)
A Little Princess (World Masterpiece Theater)
Lucy of the Southern Rainbow (World Masterpiece Theater)
Macross 7
Macross Dynamite 7
Mobile Fighter G Gundam
Mobile Suit Gundam (credited as "Ishida Sound")
Mobile Suit Gundam: The 08th MS Team
Mobile Suit Gundam 0083: Stardust Memory
Mobile Suit Gundam F91
Mobile Suit Gundam SEED
Mobile Suit Gundam SEED Destiny
Mobile Suit Gundam Wing
Mobile Suit Victory Gundam
Zeta Gundam A New Translation: Heirs to the Stars
Zeta Gundam A New Translation II: Lovers
Zeta Gundam A New Translation III: Love is the Pulse of the Stars
Monster Rancher
Nintama Rantarō
Oishinbo
One Piece
Peter Pan (World Masterpiece Theater)
Planetes
Pollyanna (World Masterpiece Theater)
Rascal the Raccoon (World Masterpiece Theater)
Remi, Nobody's Girl (World Masterpiece Theater)
Rockman EXE series
Romeo and the Black Brothers (World Masterpiece Theater)
Sans Famille (World Masterpiece Theater)
Shimajiro (1993-1994 series)
Soreike! Anpanman series
Sgt. Frog
The Story of Perrine (World Masterpiece Theater)
Story of the Alps: My Annette (World Masterpiece Theater)
Stitch!
Super Gals!
The Super Dimension Fortress Macross
The Super Dimension Fortress Macross: Do You Remember Love?
The Snow Queen
Tico of the Seven Seas (World Masterpiece Theater)
Tonde Burin
UFO Ultramaiden Valkyrie
Urusei Yatsura
Yawara! A Fashionable Judo Girl
Yūsha series
Zoids series

Freelance production
This list contains some of the productions in which individual employees of FIZZ took part, but for which the company itself was not hired. Any productions which are listed in the Principal production list are not repeated here.
Akihiko Matsuda
21-emon
Armor Hunter Mellowlink
Armored Trooper Votoms
B·B
Batsu & Terī
Biriken nan demo Shōkai
Blue Comet SPT Layzner
Chinpui
Chuka Ichiban
Coji-Coji
Cyborg 009 The Movie: Legend of the Super Galaxy
Dirty Pair: Affair of Nolandia
Esper Mami
Fang of the Sun Dougram
Five Star Stories
Fuku-chan
Game Center Arashi
Hēi! Bunbū
Hunter × Hunter
Kaibutsu-kun (1980 version, this was the first credit under the "Fizz Sound Creation" name)
Kerokero Chaimu
Kikōkai Galient
Locke the Superman
Makiba no Shōjo Katori (from episode 2)
Meiken Jolie
Mikan Enikki
Mini-Dora SOS (Doraemon movie)
Ninja Senshi Tobikage
Patalliro!
Pro Golfer Saru
Queen Millennia
Seijūshi Bismarck
Shin Pro Golfer Saru
Shizukanaru Don – Yakuza Side Story
Shōkōshi Cedie
Shūkan Storyland
Space Runaway Ideon
Uchū Ōji
Watashi no Ashinaga Ojisan
Wow, The Kid Gang of Bandits (Doraemon movie)

Hidenori Arai
Bosukoa Adventure
Ceres, Celestial Legend
Chōkuse ni Narisō
Dororonpa!
Gu-Gu Ganmo
Gun Frontier
Karaoke Senshi Maiku Jirō
Katapishi
Lost Universe
Mama wa Shōgaku Yonensei
Miracle Girls
Masked Ninja Red Shadow (anime series)
Rainbowman (anime version)
Shōnen Ashibe series
Slayers series
Tsuru Pika Hagemaru-kun
Masahiro Shōji
Burn Up Scramble
Cluster Edge
Code Geass - Lelouch of the Rebellion
Cyber Team in Akihabara
Desert Punk
Doraemon movie series
Eden's Bowy
éX-Driver
Excel Saga
F
Gasaraki
Genki Bakuhatsu Ganbarugā
Gun X Sword
Haibane Renmei
Heisei Inu Monogatari Bau
Idol Densetsu Eriko
Infinite Ryvius
Iria: Zeiram the Animation
Kage Kara Mamoru!
Legend of Heavenly Sphere Shurato
Mahōjin Guru Guru series
Martian Successor Nadesico
Moero! Top Striker
NG Knight Ramune & 40
Omishi Magical Theater: Risky Safety
Pigmalio
Scryed
Seven of Seven
Silent Möbius
Steam Detectives
Super Gals! Kotobuki Ran
VS. Knight Ramune & 40 Fire
Yokohama Kaidashi Kikō
Zettai Muteki Raijin-Oh

Mutsuhiro Nishimura
Demon Lord Dante
Elfen Lied
Hikaru no Go

External links
Fizz Sound Creation

Mass media companies established in 1971
Japanese companies established in 1971
Anime companies
Mass media companies based in Tokyo